Kolpewadi is a village in Kopargaon taluka, Ahmednagar district, Maharashtra, India.
Kolpewadi had a population of 5449, of whom 2787 were male and 2662 female, at the time of the 2011 Census of India. There were 742 children aged 0–6, being 13.62% of the total population. The Average Sex Ratio was 955, which was higher than the Maharashtra state average of 929. The Child Sex Ratio was 878, lower than the Maharashtra average of 894. 2318 people were engaged in work activities. 93.57% of workers describe their work as Main Work (Employment or Earning more than 6 Months) while 6.43% were involved in Marginal activity providing livelihood for less than 6 months. Of the 2318 workers, 489 were cultivators (owner or co-owner) while 1001 were agricultural labourers. Scheduled Tribes constituted 6.39% of the populate and Scheduled Castes were 6.09%.

Kolpewadi is administered by a Sarpanch (Head of Village) who is an elected representative. Its Pincode is 423602. Its STD code is 02423.

History:

Many years ago, a dhanagar was arrived to a small hill with sheep and goats in search of food. He liked this place and decided to stay on the hill. Then he blessed with 4 sons. Every son then extended their family and now we are few thousands in number. We have 4 "Wada's" which are extended families of 4 sons. Kolpe is last name of all successors and Kolpewadi is name of the village.Rudra Kolpe is one of successor

Population Statistics
Kolpewadi Data
Particulars	Total	Male	Female
Total No. of Houses	1,075	-	-
Population	5,449	2,787	2,662
Child (0-6)	742	395	347
Schedule Caste	332	167	165
Schedule Tribe	348	172	176
Literacy	72.70%	82.73%	62.33%
Total Workers	2,318	1,493	825
Main Worker	2,169	-	-
Marginal Worker	149	61	88

Agricultural
Sugarcane, wheat are  popular crops.

Education
 Shri Chhatrapati Sambhaji Prathamik Vidyalay
 Shri Chhatrapati Shivaji Vidyalay and Jr. College
 Gautam Polytechnic Institute
 Radhabai Kale Kanya Vidyamandir 
 Swami Samarth Nursing College
 Saibaba Nursing School

References

Villages in Ahmednagar district